Lajos Méhelÿ (August 24, 1862 – February 4, 1953) was a Hungarian zoologist, herpetologist, professor, and prolific author. He is one of the greatest, but also one of the most controversial, personalities in the history of Hungarian zoology because of his Social Darwinist and racialist publications. He had been a member of the Hungarian Academy of Sciences but renounced his membership.

Besides his zoological work he increasingly dedicated his life to the Hungarian racial theory and Turanism. As a result, he was imprisoned after the Second World War and spent his punishment as a war criminal against the people until his death in old age.

Life
Méhelÿ was born in Kisfalud-Szögi (today: Bodrogkisfalud). His father served as a bailiff on the Dessewffy estates in Zemplén then Sáros County. He started elementary school in his birthplace then finished fourth grade in Kassa (today: Kosice, Slovakia). He began the first class of grammar school in Eperjes (today: Prešov, Slovakia) but graduated from Lőcse (today: Levoča, Slovakia).

He studied chemistry, zoology, and botany at the Budapest University of Technology and Economics (BME). After finishing his studies he worked as an assistant professor beside János Kriesch, one of his former teachers. After that he taught in Brassó (today: Brașov, Romania) between 1885 and 1896. Here were born his first great works. From 1896 to 1915 he worked for the Department of Zoology in the Hungarian National Museum, and he was the director of the collection of mounted specimens for the last three years. This position was exchanged for his academic teacher's desk until his retirement in 1932. He taught general zoology and comparative anatomy at the Department of Zoology of the Pázmány Péter Catholic University. He was a member of the Hungarian Academy of Sciences (MTA) between 1899 and 1931. After the First World War he expanded his Darwinist approach to the human sciences and started dealing with racialist biology. He had devoted his life to this idea, increasingly tightened into the background his former zoological activity. After WW2 he was sentenced to life imprisonment by a People's Tribunal in 1945. He died in 1953.

Herpetology
While at the Hungarian National Museum, Méhelÿ studied amphibians and reptiles. He described several new species of frogs, and seven new species of lizards. The snake genus Mehelya was named in his honor.

References

External links
 
 
 

1862 births
1953 deaths
Hungarian zoologists
Hungarian herpetologists
Hungarian prisoners sentenced to life imprisonment
Prisoners sentenced to life imprisonment by Hungary
Hungarian people convicted of war crimes
Members of the Hungarian Academy of Sciences
Hungarian Turanism
Hungarian people who died in prison custody
Prisoners who died in Hungarian detention